The 16th Toronto International Film Festival (TIFF) took place in Toronto, Ontario, Canada between September 5 and September 14, 1991. Jodie Foster's directorial debut film Little Man Tate, premiered in the Gala Presentation at the festival.

Awards

Programme

Gala Presentation
The Fisher King by Terry Gilliam
Life on a String by Chen Kaige
Days of Being Wild by Wong Kar-wai
My Own Private Idaho by Gus Van Sant
Barton Fink by Joel Coen & Ethan Coen
Singapore Sling by Nikos Nikolaidis
Raise the Red Lantern by Zhang Yimou
Little Man Tate by Jodie Foster
Daughters of the Dust by Julie Dash
My Father Is Coming by Monika Treut
Delicatessen by Jean-Pierre Jeunet & Marc Caro
The Indian Runner by Sean Penn
The Double Life of Veronique by Krzysztof Kieślowski 
Hear My Song by Peter Chelsom
Prospero's Books by Peter Greenaway
The Hours and Times by Christopher Münch
Black Robe by Bruce Beresford
Lovers by Vicente Aranda
Toto the Hero by Jaco Van Dormael
La stazione by Sergio Rubini
Homework by Jaime Humberto Hermosillo
Edward II by Derek Jarman
A Woman's Tale by Paul Cox
Cold Heaven by Nicolas Roeg
Paradise by Mary Agnes Donoghue

Canadian Perspective
The Adjuster by Atom Egoyan
Clearcut by Ryszard Bugajski
Connecting Lines by Mary Daniel
Deadly Currents by Simcha Jacobovici
Des lumières dans la grande noirceur by Sophie Bissonnette
Le Diable d'Amérique by Gilles Carle
Diplomatic Immunity by Sturla Gunnarsson
The Events Leading Up to My Death by Bill Robertson
The Fabulous Voyage of the Angel (Le Fabuleux voyage de l'ange) by Jean Pierre Lefebvre
The Falls by Kevin McMahon
Flesh Angels by Bruce Elder
The Grocer's Wife by John Pozer
Highway 61 by Bruce McDonald
The Making of Monsters by John Greyson
Masala by Srinivas Krishna
New Shoes by Ann Marie Fleming
The Quarrel by Eli Cohen
RSVP by Laurie Lynd
Sam & Me by Deepa Mehta
South of Wawa by Robert Boyd
Talk 16 by Janis Lundman and Adrienne Mitchell
True Confections by Gail Singer
Understanding Bliss by William D. MacGillivray
When the Fire Burns: The Life and Music of Manuel De Falla by Larry Weinstein
Wisecracks by Gail Singer

Midnight Madness
Children of the Night by Tony Randel
The Devil's Daughter by Michele Soavi
The Borrower by John McNaughton
The Arrival by David Schmoeller
Motorama by Barry Shils
Guilty as Charged by Sam Irvin
The Raid by Tsui Hark
Blood & Concrete by Jeffrey Reiner
A Chinese Ghost Story III by Ching Siu-tung

Documentaries
Face Value by Johan van der Keuken

References

External links
 Official site
 TIFF: A Reel History: 1976 - 2012
1991 Toronto International Film Festival at IMDb

1991
1991 film festivals
1991 in Toronto
1991 in Canadian cinema